MX3 or MX-3 may refer to:

 Mazda MX-3, a car by Mazda
 Meizu MX3, a smartphone released in 2013
 MX3 class in the Motocross World Championship
 List of Malaysian films of 2003